MJP may refer to:

MJP Architects
Modernist Journals Project
Movement for Justice and Peace
Majestic Prince
Manjimup Airport, IATA airport code "MJP"